Nigel Johnson (born 10 September 1952) is a Barbadian cricketer. He played in twelve first-class and three List A matches for the Barbados cricket team from 1978 to 1985.

See also
 List of Barbadian representative cricketers

References

External links
 

1952 births
Living people
Barbadian cricketers
Barbados cricketers
People from Saint George, Barbados